Myogon may refer to several places in Burma:

Myogon, Mingin
Myogon, Shwegu